Native languages of Oceania fall into three major geographic groups:

 The large Austronesian language family, with such languages as Malay (Indonesian), Tagalog (Filipino), and Polynesian languages such as Māori and Hawaiian
 The various Aboriginal Australian language families, including the large Pama–Nyungan family
 The various Papuan language families of New Guinea and neighbouring islands, including the large Trans–New Guinea family

Contact between Austronesian and Papuan resulted in several instances in mixed languages such as Maisin.

Colonial languages include:
English in Australia, New Zealand, Hawaii, and many other territories
French in New Caledonia, in Vanuatu, in Wallis and Futuna and French Polynesia
Japanese in the Bonin Islands
Spanish on Guam, Easter Island, Galápagos Islands and Juan Fernández Islands

There are also creoles formed from the interaction of Malay or the colonial languages with indigenous languages, such as Tok Pisin, Bislama, Pijin, various Malay trade and creole languages, Samoan Plantation Pidgin, Hawaiian Pidgin, Norfuk, and Pitkern.

Finally, immigrants brought their own languages, such as Mandarin, Italian, Arabic, Cantonese, Greek and others in Australia, or Fiji Hindi in Fiji.

See also

 Culture of Oceania
 Languages of Africa
 Languages of Asia

References

External links